Berkeley Springs State Park is situated in the center of Berkeley Springs, West Virginia, USA. The centerpiece of the Park is its historic mineral spa.  These waters were celebrated for their medicinal or restorative powers and were generally taken internally for digestive disorders, or bathed in for stress relief. Native peoples visited these springs as did George Washington. Berkeley Springs is the only state-run spa in the United States and is operated by the West Virginia Division of Natural Resources.

History
The Park is located on land which has been used as a health resort since the 1750s as the property of Lord Fairfax. On 18 March 1748, George Washington, then 16, visited the spa for the first time. An annual event is held to commemorate this historic visit, but the tub where Washington supposedly bathed was rebuilt in the 1930s. Colonial maps dating as early as 1740 credit medicinal properties to the springs'  waters.

The land was officially granted to Virginia in 1776. The town of Bath was incorporated that same year (it was called Warm Springs before its incorporation).

The historic Roman Bathhouse, the oldest public building in Berkeley Springs, was built in Federal-style architecture in 1815 on the site of an earlier bathhouse attributed to James Rumsey. The earlier bathhouse, built in 1784, is described as having had five bathing chambers and dressing rooms.

On 1 January 2019, the Old Roman Bathhouse building closed down for renovation (including handicap access, new bath tiles, bath benches, new boiler system) for a period of 6 months and a $1-million budget.

Mineral springs
Water flows from natural mineral springs at a constant temperature of 74.3 degrees, emerging from  the Oriskany (Ridgeley) sandstone of Warm Springs Ridge. Five major springs merge on the location of the spa. The water contains significant amounts of sulfates, nitrates, and carbonates—mostly magnesium carbonates.

The water is available for bathing at two park bathhouses and for drinking from a fountain at the 19th century Gentlemen's Spring House — as well as from every tap in town since the springs serve as the source of the municipal water supply. The current bathhouse includes nine separate bathing chambers with tubs capable of holding a total 750 gallons of water heated to 102 degrees. These baths are open to the public daily throughout the year and water is also bottled and sold commercially.

The town is also the organizer of the annual Berkeley Springs’ International Water Tasting Competition.

Museum
The Museum of the Berkeley Springs is located on the second floor of the bathhouse.  Established in 1984, it exhibits various historical items of natural and cultural significance to the springs and town.  Admission is free, and the museum is open at least on weekends from March through December.

Gallery

See also
National Register of Historic Places listings in West Virginia
List of West Virginia state parks
Warm Spring Run

References

External links 
 
Museum of the Berkeley Springs

Bath (Berkeley Springs), West Virginia
Destination spas
Historic districts in Morgan County, West Virginia
History museums in West Virginia
Museums in Morgan County, West Virginia
National Register of Historic Places in Morgan County, West Virginia
Natural history of West Virginia
Parks on the National Register of Historic Places in West Virginia
Protected areas of Morgan County, West Virginia
State parks of West Virginia